Eskişehir Technical University (ESTU) is a state technical university in Turkey. On May 18, 2018, it started to provide education in Eskişehir with five faculties, three institutes and two vocational schools in two different campuses. As of 2019, the university continues its education with 1,317 staff and more than 12,000 students.

The university is the only university in Turkey that provides piloting training by the state.

Thanks to the Hasan Polatkan Airport it contains, it is one of the largest universities in Turkey. The university has the world's first licensed university airport with its operating license in 2007.

The only center in Turkey where seismic isolators can be tested is at ESTU. ESTU Seismic Isolator Center is also one of the top 5 centers in the world.

History 
Eskişehir Technical University was founded with the Law No. 7141 published in the Official Gazette of the Republic of Turkey numbered 30425 on May 18, 2018

Academic Units 
There are 5 faculties: Faculty of Engineering, Faculty of Aviation and Space Sciences, Faculty of Science, Faculty of Architecture and Design, and Faculty of Sports Sciences. There are 3 institutes, namely Institute of Graduate Education, Institute of Transportation Sciences, Institute of Earth and Space Sciences. There are 2 vocational schools, namely Porsuk Vocational School and Transportation Vocational School.

Iki Eylul campus is 5 kilometers from the city center. Hasan Polatkan Airport is also on this campus. The control of this airport belongs to Eskişehir Technical University.

Faculties

Faculty of Engineering 
It was established in 1970 as "Eskişehir State Engineering-Architecture Academy". In 1983, it was named "Faculty of Engineering and Architecture". In 1993, it was transferred to Osmangazi University with the infrastructure, machinery and equipment of the faculty. It was renewed in 1994 and started education again. In 2012, the department of architecture within the faculty was separated and the name of the faculty was changed to "Engineering Faculty".
Electrical and Electronics Engineering(English)
Computer Engineering (English)
Materials Science and Engineering (English)
 Industrial Engineering
 Environmental Engineering
 Chemical Engineering
 Civil Engineering
 Mechanical Engineering

Faculty of Engineering Interdisciplinary Programs 

 Mechatronics
 Sustainable Clean Energy
 Autonomous Vehicles Technology
 Artificial Intelligence and Machine Learning
 Software and Optimization

Faculty of Aeronautics and Astronautics 
It was established in 1986 as 'Civil Aviation Vocational School'. It was renamed 'Civil Aviation College' in 1992. In 2012, it was named 'Faculty of Aviation and Space Sciences'.

 Flight Training
 Avionics
 Airframe and Powerplant Maintenance
 Aviation Management
 Air Traffic Control

Faculty of Science 

 Mathematics
 Physics
 Chemistry
 Biology
 Statistics

Faculty of Science Interdisciplinary Programs 

 Business Analytics
 Chemical, Biological, Radiological and Nuclear (CBRN) Defense
 Nanoscience

Faculty of Architecture and Design 
Architecture department was separated from the Faculty of Engineering and Architecture. It was established in 2011 as "Faculty of Architecture and Design".
 Interior Design
 Architecture
 Industrial Design
 Textile and Fashion Design

Faculty of Sport Sciences 
It was established in 1993 as the "School of Physical Education and Sports". In 2013, it was renamed as "Faculty of Sports Sciences".
 Coach Training in Sports
 Physical Education and Sports Teaching
 Recreation and Sports
 Sports Management

School of Foreign Languages

Basic Foreign Languages 
Preparatory training is given in English, German and French. The preparatory program is compulsory in departments where education is given in a foreign language. Departments providing education in Turkish can optionally receive preparatory education.

Modern Foreign Languages 
While continuing their academic education, students can study Japanese, Chinese, Spanish, Italian, Russian, French, German and English at different levels.

Institutes

Graduate School of Education 
It was established in 2019

 Electrical and Electronics Engineering
 Flight Training

 Advanced Technologies
 Computer Engineering
 Environmental Engineering
 Industrial Engineering
 Civil Engineering
 Mechanical Engineering
 Materials Science and Engineering
 Biology
 Industrial Arts
 Physics
 Aviation Electrics and Electronics
 Air Traffic Control
 Statistics
 Chemistry
 Chemical Engineering
 Mathematics
 Architecture
 Ceramic Engineering
 Civil Aviation
 Airframe and Powerplant Maintenance

 Remote Sensing and Geographic Information Systems
 Earth Sciences
 Interior Architecture
 Fashion and Textile Design
 Rail Systems Engineering
 Physical Education and Sports
 Sports Management
 Logistics Management
 Movement and Training Sciences
 Aviation Management

Institute of Transportation Sciences 
It was established in 1993 as "Transportation Economics Research Institute". In 2012, it was named "Institute of Transportation Sciences". It is the first and only institute working in this field.

Institute of Earth and Space Sciences 
In 1989, Remote Sensing and Geographic Information Systems studies started. It was established in 1993 as "Satellite and Space Sciences Research Institute". In 2012, it was named "Institute of Earth and Space Sciences".

 Geodesy and Geographic Information Technologies
 Satellite and Space Sciences
 Earth Sciences and Earthquake Engineering

Vocational Schools

Porsuk Vocational School 

 Printing and Publishing Technologies
 Computer Programming
 Generation, Transmission and Distri.of Ele
 Radio and Television Technology
 Mechatronich
 Unmanned Aerial Vehicle Technology and Operations
 Mechanical Drawing and Construction
 Graphic Design
 Building Inspection

Vocational School of Transportation 

 Logistics
Railroad Electric and Electronics
Railroad Machine Technology
Railroad Construction
Rail Transport Mechanic Training
Civil Aviation Cabin Services
Railroad Transportation Management
Transportation and Traffic Services

Student Teams and Clubs 
There are 18 student clubs at the university.

There are 5 engineering teams, namely Hidroana, ESTU Solar Team, ESTU UAV, Autonomous Vehicle Team and RovsTech, which carry out R&D studies. These engineering teams have achieved degrees in various national and international competitions.

Student Engineering Teams

Student Clubs

Academies Established With The Cooperation of ESTU and Industry

ESTU - Ford Otosan Academy 
ESTU - Ford Otosan Academy was established with the protocol signed between Eskişehir Technical University and Ford Otosan Eskişehir.

ESTU - Alp Havacılık Academy 
Eskişehir Technical University and Alp Aviation Industry and Trade Inc. ESTU - Alp Aviation Academy was established with the protocol signed between

ESTU - Basarsoft Academy 
Eskişehir Technical University and Başarsoft Bilgi Teknolojileri A.Ş. ESTU - Başarsoft Academy was established with the protocol signed between

ESTU - Netcad Academy 
Eskişehir Technical University and Netcad Yazılım A.Ş. ESTU - Netcad Academy was established with the protocol signed between

ESTU - Vitra Academy 
ESTU - Vitra Academy was established with the protocol signed between Eskişehir Technical University and Eczacıbaşı - Vitra.

Campuses 
Eskisehir Technical University; It serves on a total area of 5,696,400 m2, including İki Eylül Campus, Porsuk Campus, and Borabey Campus. In addition, within the Anadolu University Campus area, there are the service buildings of the Faculty of Science and Architecture and Design, and the Nanoboyut Research Laboratory. ESTU is one of only two universities on a global scale with its own airport on campus.

İki Eylül Campus 
Iki Eylul Campus is located in the north of the city and 5 km away from the city. The total area of the campus is 4.530.000 m2, of which 273.330 m2 is green space.

Units located at İki Eylül Campus;

 Faculty of Aeronautics and Astronautics,
 Engineering faculty,
 Sports Science Faculty,
 Graduate Education Institute,
 Earth and Space Sciences Institute,
 School of Foreign Languages,
 Open and Distance Education Application and Research Center (ESTUZEM),
 Environmental Problems Application and Research Center (ÇEVMER),
 Advanced Technologies Application and Research Center (ITAM),
 Civil Aviation Research and Application Center,
 Hasan Polatkan Airport, Terminal Block, Tower and Hangars,
 Academic Club,
 Medico Social Center,
 Student and Staff Dining Halls,
 Outdoor sports facility (a tartan track and a turf football field),
 Indoor sports facility (5,000-seat gym and branch halls).

Porsuk Campus 
Porsuk campus is located in the city center and has a total area of 20,700 m2. 13,977 m2 of this is green area and the rest consists of the college building, social spaces and sports facilities.

Units located in the Porsuk Campus:

 Porsuk Vocational School
 Transportation Vocational School,
 Institute of Transport Sciences.

Borabey Campus 
The total area of the Borabey campus is 1,145,700 m2.

Sports Facilities

Eskişehir Technical University Sports Hall 
It has a closed area of 22,800 square meters and a capacity of 5003 spectators. In addition to academic and sports events within the university, it hosts national and international competitions and organizations.

Basketball, Volleyball and Handball competitions are held in the gym. There is a hall where archery athletes can train.

There is a fitness center with an area of 614 square meters.

The sauna, which was put into use in 2014, has a capacity of 12 people. In this section, there are 2 dressing rooms, 2 relaxation rooms and 1 massage room.

The Sports Facility of The Faculty of Sport Sciences 
There are 11 different indoor sports halls in the sports facility, which has an indoor area of 4110 square meters. These halls; It consists of a multi-purpose sports hall (basketball, handball, volleyball), artistic gymnasium, rhythmic gymnastics hall, badminton hall, table tennis hall, folk dance hall, billiards hall, massage hall, fitness-conditioning hall and squash hall.

There is an athletics track in compliance with IAAF standards. There is a football stadium with a seating capacity of 12527 and an indoor sports hall with a seating capacity of 5025.

Porsuk Sports Hall 
Porsuk Sports Hall has 220 square meters of indoor sports area. It is a sports facility where university club teams and infrastructure volleyball activities of the Turkish Volleyball Federation are carried out.

ESTU Media

ESTU Aktif 
ESTÜ Aktif is an e-newspaper regularly published by Eskişehir Technical University. Instructors and students take an active role in the preparation of the newspaper. It is published regularly on the 1st and 15th of each month.

Radyo ESTU 
Radyo ESTU is the radio of Eskişehir Technical University.

ESTU Bülten 
ESTU Bülten is the monthly publication of Eskişehir Technical University, where it shares its studies and scientific research.

Hasan Polatkan Airport 
It is operated by Eskişehir Technical University. The airport was opened to traffic in 1989. It went down in history as the world's first licensed university airport with the operating license it received in 2007.

Within Hasan Polatkan Airport;

 Eskişehir Technical University flight trainings
 VIP/CIP flights
 Air taxi and ambulance flights
 Training flights of private flight schools
 Scheduled/non-scheduled domestic passenger transport flights
 Scheduled/non-scheduled international passenger transport flights

being carried out.

References 

Educational institutions established in 2018
Buildings and structures in Eskişehir
2018 establishments in Turkey
Universities and colleges in Turkey